Neocallia pubescens is a species of beetle in the family Cerambycidae, and the only species in the genus Neocallia. It was described by Fisher in 1933.

References

Calliini
Beetles described in 1933
Monotypic beetle genera